Washington Township is a township in Republic County, Kansas, in the United States. It has an approximate area of 35.92 mi2.

History
Washington Township was organized in 1872.

References

Townships in Republic County, Kansas
Townships in Kansas